Jimmy Harry is an American songwriter, producer, and multi-instrumentalist who currently resides in Los Angeles, California.  Harry has worked with artists such as Madonna, Pink, Weezer, Kylie Minogue, Kelly Clarkson, Fischerspooner, Oh Land, and Santana.  Recognized at the 2012 Golden Globes by the Hollywood Foreign Press Association, he won "Best Original Song" with Madonna and Julie Frost for the song "Masterpiece". In 2010 his production of Pink's "Sober" was nominated for a Grammy for "Best Female Pop Vocal Performance", and he also wrote and produced "Funhouse", the title track of her release nominated in the category "Best Pop Album". Jimmy received recognition from the Academy of Canadian Cinema & Television at the 2014 Canadian Screen Awards where he and Serena Ryder won "Best Original Song" for the song "It's No Mistake" from the film The Right Kind of Wrong.

Producer and songwriter discography

References

External links
Air-Edel Associates

Year of birth missing (living people)
Living people
Songwriters from California
Best Original Song Genie and Canadian Screen Award winners
Golden Globe Award-winning musicians